Tobyhanna Army Depot (TYAD) (previously known as Tobyhanna Signal Depot), is a 'full-service electronics maintenance facility' tasked to provide logistical support for Command, Control, Communications, Computers, Cyber, Intelligence, Surveillance and Reconnaissance (C5ISR) Systems for the United States Department of Defense. The depot was established on February 1, 1953 and is located in Coolbaugh Township, Monroe County, near Tobyhanna, Pennsylvania. 

It is the largest industrial employer in Northeastern, PA, supports the "sustainment, overhaul and repair, fabrication and manufacturing, engineering design and development, systems integration, technology insertion, modification, and global field support." TYAD also facilitates the United States Air Force Technology Repair Center for tactical ballistic missiles, rigid-wall shelters and portable buildings.

Current activities
The depot's current functions are the design, manufacture, repair, and overhaul of electronic systems.  These include satellite terminals, radio and radar systems, telephones, electro-optics, night vision and anti-intrusion devices, airborne surveillance equipment, navigational instruments, electronic warfare, and guidance and control systems for tactical missiles.

The U.S. Army has designated Tobyhanna as its Center of Industrial and Technical Excellence for C4ISR and Electronics, Avionics, and Missile Guidance and Control. The Air Force has designated Tobyhanna as its "Technical Source of Repair for command, control, communications, and intelligence systems." Tobyhanna has gained new missions and workload in each of the five rounds of Defense Base Realignment and Closure (BRAC) between 1988 and 2005.

The depot also is the largest employer in northeastern Pennsylvania, with more than 5,000 personnel working at the installation. The depot's regional economic impact approaches $2 billion annually. The depot also operates 30 Forward Repair Activities at major U.S. installations and overseas, including in Southwest Asia.

In 2005, President George W. Bush delivered his Veterans Day address at Tobyhanna Army Depot, commending the installation as a "facility that has provided critical services for our armed forces" and applauded the depot workers as men and women who have been "carrying out dangerous missions with bravery and skill".

In late 2016, it was reported that the depot now uses an anechoic chamber to test radars by simulating signals and targets. The initial cost of the chamber was recouped in around eight months because the systems did not have to be shipped to the Yuma Proving Ground.

History
From 1900 to 1936, Tobyhanna Lake, and nearby lakes at Gouldsboro and Klondike, were sites of ice collection and storage, producing up to 150 boxcar loads per day between them that were shipped as far as Florida.

In 1912, Tobyhanna had a railway station, telegraph, and post office.  At that time the U.S. Army had no artillery training range east of Wisconsin, and Major Charles P. Summerall, commander of the 3rd Field Artillery at Fort Myer, Virginia chose the site as a suitable training range. After leasing land for $300 in 1912 and 1913, Summerall persuaded Congress to authorize the purchase of 18,000 acres (73 km²) for $50,000; eventually, the military reservation was expanded to 22,000 acres (89 km²) (according to the Tobyhanna Army Depot) or 26,000 acres (105 km²) (according to Pennsylvania DCNR).

The land was used as a tank and ambulance corps training center from 1914–to 1918, for artillery training from 1918–1931 and 1937–to 1941, and to house Civilian Conservation Corps enrolled from es 1931–to 1937.

During World War II, initial plans for use of the site as a training site for anti-aircraft artillery were dropped, due to the long range of more modern weapons—some shells strayed onto private land, and "the Scranton Times reported that crews could only fire one or two shells during each pass of a target, and guns were limited to a 65-degree firing arc".  Subsequently, the camp became the base of an all-black segregated ambulance corps, and a military hospital (19 single-story structures) was constructed in expectation of casualties from the invasion of Japan. At the end of World War II, the military reservation became one of 138 sites around the United States holding German prisoners of war (a maximum of 300 POWs), and was used for storage of gliders used in the D-Day invasion.  From 1946 to 1948 it was used by the U.S. Army Corps of Engineers. In April 1949, most of the military reservation was returned to Pennsylvania, and converted into Game Land 127, Gouldsboro State Park, and Tobyhanna State Park, while 1,400 acres (5.7 km²), after briefly being transferred to Pennsylvania, were reacquired by the Army Signal Corps in 1951 as the Tobyhanna Army Depot. This site was selected as having access to East Coast shipping and manufacturers while being outside of possible nuclear blast radii surrounding New York City and Scranton. At that time, the decline of anthracite coal mining in the region had led to the unemployment of 35,000 workers in the region, and the new Depot received 600 job applications per day two years in advance of its opening. Tobyhanna is Northeastern Pennsylvania's largest employer.

Contracts 
On September 29, 2020, Senate Builders & Construction Managers Inc. was contracted to upgrade and renovate Building 1E at the Depot.

References

External links

Transcript of President Bush's 2005 Veterans' Day Iraq Policy Address At the Depot

United States Army logistics installations
Military facilities in Pennsylvania
Military Superfund sites
Superfund sites in Pennsylvania
Civilian Conservation Corps in Pennsylvania
Pocono Mountains
Buildings and structures in Monroe County, Pennsylvania
Historic American Engineering Record in Pennsylvania